Aurora Teagarden is a fictional character created by author Charlaine Harris. She is the protagonist of a series of eleven crime novels written from 1990 to 2017. Hallmark Movies & Mysteries began  adapting the novels in 2014 for their original film series The Aurora Teagarden Mysteries with Candace Cameron Bure in the title role, part of the network’s "Mystery Wheel" umbrella series.

In the first book of the series, twenty-eight-year-old Aurora (Roe) Teagarden is a professional librarian at the Lawrenceton Public Library and belongs to the Real Murders Club, a group of "True Crime" enthusiasts who gather monthly to study famous crimes from the history of their Georgia town.

Aurora Teagarden book series

 Real Murders (1990)
 A Bone to Pick (1992)
 Three Bedrooms, One Corpse (1994)
 The Julius House (1995)
 Dead over Heels (1996)
 "Deeply Dead" in Murder, They Wrote (1997)
 A Fool and His Honey (1999)
 Last Scene Alive (2002)
 Poppy Done to Death (2003)
 All the Little Liars (2016)
 Sleep Like a Baby (2017)

TV adaptation
On June 4, 2014, author Charlaine Harris announced on her Facebook page that the Aurora Teagarden books would be adapted into a series of two-hour films, starring Candace Cameron Bure and would air on the Hallmark Movies and Mysteries Channel. Bure announced her departure in April 2022, based on a new development deal with GAC Family. In March 2023, Hallmark announced a prequel film  with Skyler Samuels starring as a young Aurora Teagarden.

Cast
Candace Cameron Bure as Aurora "Roe" Teagarden, a librarian in the small town of Lawrenceton, Washington (unlike the Georgia location of the novels) who runs the Real Murders Club. Married Nick Miller in Aurora Teagarden Til Death Do Us Part. In Honeymoon, Honeymurder it is mentioned that her last name is now Miller.
Lexa Doig as Sally Allison, a reporter with the local newspaper, Aurora's best friend, and a member of the Real Murders Club
Marilu Henner as Aida Teagarden, the town's real estate agent and Aurora's mother who disapproves of her daughter's involvement in solving murders
Bruce Dawson as John Queensland, an active member of the Real Murders Club who shares Aurora's passion to solve murders and later starts dating Aurora's mother
Miranda Frigon as Lynn Smith, a detective with the homicide division of the police force (later chief) who often finds Aurora annoyingly in the middle of her investigations
Peter Benson as Arthur Smith, Roe's best friend and a detective with the burglary division of the police force who is married to Lynn Smith and briefly dated Aurora.
Yannick Bisson as Martin Bartell (introduced in Three Bedrooms, One Corpse), a former CIA agent who moves to town, falls in love with Aurora, and later dates her. Bisson left the series in 2018.
Niall Matter as Nick Miller (introduced in The Disappearing Game), a college professor who lives opposite Aurora, and helps her with her investigations; Psychology Professor at College. Engaged to Roe as of Heist and Seek, married Roe in Til death do us part.

Characters

List of television films

Production and filming
The films in the series are shot largely in Vancouver, British Columbia, while the waterfall seen in the opening sequence of many of the films is Chequagua Falls in the village of Montour Falls, Schuyler County, New York. And while the novels are set in the southeastern American state of Georgia, the TV-movies are set in the Pacific Northwestern state of Washington.

Broadcast
The films are broadcast in the United States on Hallmark Movies & Mysteries. Channel 5 took over the broadcast rights for the series in the UK. Canada also airs the films on W Network, which acquired all the Hallmark Movies.

Awards
Til Death Do Us Part received two Canadian Screen Award nominations at the 10th Canadian Screen Awards in 2022, for Best Actress in a Television Movie (Bure) and Best Actor in a Television Movie (Matter).

References

External links
 Author's site
 

Fictional librarians
Fictional amateur detectives
Characters in American novels of the 20th century
Characters in American novels of the 21st century
Literary characters introduced in 1990
Hallmark Channel original programming
Hallmark Channel original films